Everton Guimarães Ferreira (born 14 November 1986) is a Brazilian footballer who plays for Tricolor de Vila Formosa (as of January 2011).

Biography
Everton started his professional career at Guarani (SP). In the 2006 Campeonato Brasileiro Série B, he appeared once as unused bench. He then played for the futsal side River Zona Sul Futsal and in May 2008 signed a contract with Esporte Clube União Suzano for the 2008 Campeonato Paulista Segunda Divisão. In August 2008, he left for the Portuguese Second Division side Tourizense and then the Romanian Liga I club Gloria Buzău. He was fired in November 2008, along with Tiago.

He then played for Grêmio Jaciara and, in March 2009, was signed by Rio Verde (MS) until the end of 2009 Campeonato Sul-Matogrossense. He then played for Big Preço FS, a 7-a-side football team in São Caetano do Sul, São Paulo state. He also played for Tricolor de Vila Formosa, an amateur side in Vila Formosa, São Paulo city. before being signed again by Rio Verde (MS) in March 2010. His contract was extended in May, after he had played 11 games in 2010 Campeonato Sul-Matogrossense. He was released again in January 2011.

References

External links
 football-lineups.com profile
 Youtube video

Brazilian footballers
Guarani FC players
FC Gloria Buzău players
Brazilian expatriate footballers
Brazilian expatriate sportspeople in Romania
Expatriate footballers in Romania
Association football midfielders
1986 births
Living people